The 2009 winners of the Torneo di Viareggio (in English, the Viareggio Tournament, officially the Viareggio Cup World Football Tournament Coppa Carnevale), the annual youth football tournament held in Viareggio, Tuscany, are listed below.

Format 

The 40 teams are seeded in 10 pools, split up into 5-pool groups. Each team from a pool meets the others in a single tie. The winning club from each pool and three best runners-up from both group A and group B progress to the final knockout stage. All matches in the final rounds are single tie. The Round of 16 envisions penalties and no extra time, while the rest of the final round matches include 30 minutes extra time and penalties to be played if the draw between teams still holds.

Participating teams
Italian teams

  Atalanta
  Bari
  Bologna
  Cesena
  Cisco Roma
  Empoli
  Fiorentina
  Frosinone
  Genoa
  Inter Milan
  Juventus
  Lazio
  Milan
  Novara
  Palermo
  Parma
  Pisa
  Serie D Representatives
  Reggina
  Rimini
  Roma
  Sampdoria
  Siena
  Torino
  Vicenza

European teams

  Aarhus
  Anderlecht
  Belasica
  Dukla Prague
  Midtjylland
  QPR
  Spartak Moscow

Asian teams

  Maccabi Haifa
  Paxtakor

African Team
  RC Bobo

American teams

  L.I.A.C. of New York
  Nacional Asunción
  Independiente Santa Fé
  Pumas

Oceanian teams
   APIA Tigers

Group stage

Group A

Pool 1

Pool 2

Pool 3

Pool 4

Pool 5

Group B

Pool 6

Pool 7

Pool 8

Pool 9

Pool 10

Knockout stage

Champions

Top goalscorers 

8 goals
  Ayub Daud ( Juventus)

6 goals

  Denis D'Onofrio  Torino)
  Pietro Iannazzo  Reggina)

4 goals

  Nicola Ferrari ( Sampdoria)
  Ciro Immobile ( Juventus)

Footnotes

External links 
Official Site (Italian)
Results on RSSSF.COM

Torneo di Viareggio
2009 in association football
2008–09 in Italian football